Frans Lodewijk Strieleman (7 November 1926 in Antwerp – 29 January 1999 in Aartselaar) was a Belgian journalist, chief editor of the De Nieuwe Gazet, chief editor of the Volksbelang and the De Vlaamse Gids.

Sources
 Frans Strieleman
 R. De Schryver, B; De Wever, et al., Nieuwe Encyclopedie van de Vlaamse Beweging, Tielt-Utrecht, Lannoo, 1998, 3 vol., p. 2875.

1926 births
1999 deaths
Flemish journalists
Writers from Antwerp